Dufourea marginata is a species of sweat bee in the family Halictidae. It is found in North America.

Subspecies
These two subspecies belong to the species Dufourea marginata:
 Dufourea marginata halictella Michener, 1951
 Dufourea marginata marginata (Cresson, 1878)

References

Further reading

External links

 

Halictidae
Articles created by Qbugbot
Insects described in 1878